Mind Breaths is a book of poetry by Allen Ginsberg published by City Lights Publishers.  It contains poems written by Ginsberg between 1972 and 1977.
  
Some of these poems include:

"Ayers Rock Uluru Song" (about Uluru, or Ayers Rock)
"Under the World There's a Lot of Ass"
"On Neruda's Death" (about Pablo Neruda)
"Sweet Boy, Gimme Yr Ass"
"Sad Dust Glories"
"Ego Confessions"
"Jaweh and Allah Battle"
"Mugging"
"We Rise on Sunbeams and Fall in the Night" (about the death of William Carlos Williams)
"Hadda Be Playing on the Jukebox"
"Rolling Thunder Stones"
"Don't Grow Old"
"Contest of Bards"

References

Poetry by Allen Ginsberg
Beat poetry
American poetry collections
1978 poetry books
City Lights Publishers books